The Scinde, Punjab, Delhi Railway  was formed in 1870 from the incorporation of the Scinde Railway, Indus Steam Flotilla, Punjab Railway and Delhi Railway companies. This was covered by the Scinde Railway Company's Amalgamation Act  of 1869.

History
The Scinde, Punjab, Delhi Railway inherited the unfortunate reputation as being one of the worst managed private railway companies. Given its reputation in the 1860s and 1870s for discord, shady and inept contractors and financial irregularities, it is surprising that the SP&DR did not pass into public ownership sooner than 31 December 1885. After its purchase, the SP&DR was merged with several other railways to form the North Western State Railway.

1855: Scinde Railway formed. After 11 surveys and 18 months the route was approved.
1857: Punjab Railway formed.
1858: commencement of the Karachi-Kotri section of Scinde Railway.
1859: contracts signed to construct Multan-Lahore-Amritsar section and operate the Indus Steam Flotilla, thus linking the Scinde and Punjab Railways together.
1861: Karachi-Kotri line of Scinde Railways opens to the public.
1862: Amritsar-Attari section completed on the route to Lahore.
1863: plans for Delhi-Amritsar section (Delhi Railway).
1870: Scinde, Punjab & Delhi Railway (SP&DR) company formed when Scinde Railway, Punjab Railway, the Indus Steam Flotilla and Delhi Railway merge - thus linking Karachi via Multan to Lahore.
1886: contracts expired and responsibility for the SP&DR was transferred entirely to the government, which would merge the company into the North Western State Railway.

Rolling stock

By the end of 1877 the company owned 151 steam locomotives, 517 coaches and 2969 goods wagons.

See also
 History of rail transport in Pakistan
 Scinde Railway 
 Indus Steam Flotilla 
 Punjab Railway
 Pakistan Railways

Notes
Bibliography
The spelling of Scinde, Punjaub & Delhi Railway is variable. Scinde and Punjaub are the spellings adopted in the legislation - see "Government Statute Law Repeals 2012" pages 134-135, paragraphs 3.78-3.83.

References

External links
 Fairlawn School was established as Scind, Punjaub and Delhi Railway School, Mussoorie in 1877 
 Thacker's "1872 Scinde, Punjab and Delhi Railway Personnel"
  “British Library Archives and Manuscripts Catalogue” - Search; Retrieved 14 Jun 2016

Transport in Karachi
Transport in Amritsar
Transport in Multan
Transport in Gwalior
Transport in Delhi
Transport in Lahore
Defunct railway companies of India
Defunct railway companies of Pakistan